The 1998 Chase Championships was a women's tennis tournament played on indoor carpet courts at Madison Square Garden in New York City, New York in the United States. It was the 27th edition of the year-end singles championships, the 23rd edition of the year-end doubles championships, and was part of the 1998 WTA Tour. The tournament was held from November 16 through November 22, 1998. Martina Hingis won the singles title and earned $500,000 first-prize money. It was the last edition of the tournament to be played in the best-of-five-set format for the final which it had used since 1984.

Finals

Singles

 Martina Hingis defeated  Lindsay Davenport, 7–5, 6–4, 4–6, 6–2.
 It was Hingis' 14th title of the year and the 39th of her career.

Doubles

 Lindsay Davenport /  Natasha Zvereva defeated  Alexandra Fusai /  Nathalie Tauziat, 6–7, 7–5, 6–3.
 It was Davenport's 12th title of the year and the 43rd of her career. It was Zvereva's 8th title of the year and the 81st of her career.

References

External links
WTA tournament archive – 2000 Chase Championships draw (PDF)
WTA Finals history

WTA Tour Championships
Chase Championships
Chase Championships
Chase Championships
1990s in Manhattan
Chase Championships
Madison Square Garden
Sports competitions in New York City
Sports in Manhattan
Tennis tournaments in New York City